Pravoslavlevia is an extinct genus of gorgonopsian therapsids that lived in the late Permian and is part of the Sokolki subcomplex of Russia. Only one species (P. parva) is known.

Classification
 
The following cladogram showing the position of Pravoslavlevia within Gorgonopsia follows Kammerer and Masyutin, 2018:

See also
 List of therapsids

Sources

 paleodb.org

Gorgonopsia
Prehistoric therapsid genera
Extinct animals of Russia
Fossil taxa described in 1953